Olin Tracy Nye (March 13, 1872 – January 6, 1943) was an American lawyer, judge, and politician from New York.

Life 
Nye was born on March 13, 1872 in Beaver Dams, New York, the son of E. M. W. Nye and Margaret Sharpe.

Nye attended Dundee Preparatory School. In 1893, he was appointed clerk of the Schuyler County Surrogate's Court. In 1896, he graduated from Albany Law School, was admitted to the bar, and was elected district attorney of Schuyler County. He lived in Watkin Glens.

In 1899, Nye unsuccessfully ran for the New York State Assembly, losing to J. Franklin Barnes. In 1900, he was elected to the Assembly as a Republican, representing Schuyler County. He served in the Assembly in 1901, 1902, 1903, and 1904.

After serving in the Assembly, Nye served as County Judge and Surrogate for 11 years. After resigning in 1918, he joined a law firm in Buffalo. There, he represented International Railway and tried over 2,000 cases for them, mainly involving a strike against the railway after a train wreck killed and injured many and led to over 4,000 arrests. In 1925, he re-established a law office in Schuyler County. In 1936, he was elected Judge, an office he held until a few days before he died.

Nye had two children, John and Mrs. Carolyn Sams. He served as a vestryman of St. James Episcopal Church. He was an active member of the Elks and the Red Men, serving as state Grand Sachen of the latter organization. He was dean of the Schuyler County Bar Association. He was also a member of the Knights of Pythias and the Independent Order of Odd Fellows.

Nye died at home on January 6, 1943. He was buried in Glenwood Cemetery in Watkins Glen.

References

External links 
 The Political Graveyard
 Olin T. Nye at Find a Grave

1872 births
1943 deaths
People from Watkins Glen, New York
Albany Law School alumni
County district attorneys in New York (state)
Lawyers from Buffalo, New York
New York (state) state court judges
19th-century American lawyers
20th-century American lawyers
County judges in the United States
20th-century American judges
20th-century American politicians
Republican Party members of the New York State Assembly
20th-century American Episcopalians
Burials in New York (state)